Platynostira is a genus of flies in the family Pyrgotidae, containing a single species, Platynostira turbata.

References 

Pyrgotidae
Diptera of Africa
Monotypic Brachycera genera
Taxa named by Günther Enderlein